De Witte's snout-burrower (Hemisus wittei) is a species of frog in the family Hemisotidae found in Democratic Republic of the Congo and Zambia. Its natural habitats are moist savanna, subtropical or tropical seasonally wet or flooded lowland grassland, intermittent freshwater marshes, and arable land.

References

Hemisus
Taxonomy articles created by Polbot
Amphibians described in 1963